The 1992 All-Ireland Minor Hurling Championship was the 62nd staging of the All-Ireland Minor Hurling Championship since its establishment by the Gaelic Athletic Association in 1928. The championship began on 15 April 1992 and ended on 6 September 1992.

Kilkenny entered the championship as the defending champions in search of a third successive All-Ireland title, however, they were beaten by Galway in an All-Ireland semi-final replay.

On 6 September 1992, Galway won the championship following a 1-13 to 2-04 defeat of Waterford in the All-Ireland final.	 This was their second All-Ireland title overall and their first title since 1993.

Waterford's Paul Flynn was the championship's top scorer with 6-25.

Results

Leinster Minor Hurling Championship

Quarter-final

Semi-finals

Final

Munster Minor Hurling Championship

First round

Semi-finals

Finals

Ulster Minor Hurling Championship

Semi-final

Final

All-Ireland Minor Hurling Championship

Semi-finals

Final

Championship statistics

Top scorers

Top scorers overall

Miscellaneous

 Waterford won the Munster Championship for the first time since 1948.

References

External links
 All-Ireland Minor Hurling Championship: Roll Of Honour

Minor
All-Ireland Minor Hurling Championship